Adrian S. Franklin (born 19 December 1955) is a British social anthropologist, currently Professor of Creative Industries and Cultural Policy  at the University of South Australia. He has worked on television  for the Australian Broadcasting Corporation. He worked on several ABC radio and television programs such as By Design on ABC Radio National and the television series Collectors where, with Gordon Brown and Claudia Chan Shaw, he was one of the panel of experts (specialising in the mid-twentieth century, contemporary decorative arts, design, glass, furniture, and ceramics.

Franklin was born in Canterbury, England and holds a Master of Arts in Social Anthropology from the University of Kent, and was awarded his PhD from the University of Bristol in 1989 for his thesis Privatism, the Home and Working Class Culture. He has held previous professorships at Bristol University, the University of Oslo and the University of Tasmania.

Research Interests
Creativity; more-than-human studies; animal studies; art museums and art publics; festivals; urban studies; human social bonds and loneliness studies; design; contemporary social theory; tourism.

Books
 Squatting in England, 1969–79: A Case Study of Social Conflict in Advanced Industrial Capitalism (Working Paper 37, School for Advanced Urban Studies, University of Bristol, 1984)
 Experts, Landlords and Tenants: The Private Rented Sector in Bristol (Policy Press 1992)
 New homes for home owners. London: HMSO. 1993. (with Forrest, RS., Murie, A., Gordon, D., Burton, PA., Doogan, KJ) (147pp).1993
 Home from Home - Refugees in Tasmania.  Canberra: Department of Immigration and Multicultural Affairs, AGPS. 1997. (with Roberta Julian and Bruce Felmingham) 
 Animals and Modern Cultures: A Sociology of Human–Animal Relations in Modernity (Sage 1999)
 Nature and Social Theory (Sage, 2002)
 Tourism (Sage, 2003)
 Animal Nation: The True Story of Animals and Australia (University of New South Wales Press, 2007)
 A Collectors Year (New South 2008)
 Collecting the 20th Century (University of New South Wales Press/Powerhouse Museum, 2009)
 City Life (Sage, 2010)
 Retro: A Guide to the Mid-Twentieth Century Design Revival (Bloomsbury, 2013)
 The Making of MONA (Penguin, 2014)
 Tom Moore - Abundant Wonder. Wakefield Press (with Lisa Slade and Mark Thomson, 2020). 
 Anti-museum (Routledge, 2020)
 The Routledge International Handbook of More-than-Human Studies (for 2023)

References

External links
 Professor Adrian Franklin

1955 births
Living people
Australian sociologists
Australian television presenters
English emigrants to Australia
Academic staff of the University of South Australia
Academic staff of the University of Tasmania
Academic staff of the University of Oslo
Alumni of the University of Kent
Alumni of the University of Bristol
Academics of the University of Bristol
People from Canterbury